Paulo Graça (born September 13, 1978) is a former Portuguese beach soccer player who represented Portugal in international competitions. His role was a goalkeeper. He retired in 2013 following injury.

Honours

Beach soccer

Country
 Portugal
FIFA Beach Soccer World Cup third place: 2008, 2009
Euro Beach Soccer League winner: 2008, 2010
Euro Beach Soccer League runner-up: 2009
Euro Beach Soccer League third place: 2011
Euro Beach Soccer Cup runner-up: 2010
Euro Beach Soccer Cup third place: 2009
Euro Beach Soccer League Italian Event  runner-up : 2010
Euro Beach Soccer League Netherlands Event winner : 2011
Euro Beach Soccer League German Event  runner-up : 2011
Euro Beach Soccer League Spain Event  third place : 2012
FIFA Beach Soccer World Cup qualification (UEFA) runner-up : 2008, 2011
FIFA Beach Soccer World Cup qualification (UEFA) fourth place : 2009
Mundialito winner: 2008, 2009, 2012
Mundialito runner-up: 2010, 2011

Individual
FIFA Beach Soccer World Cup qualification (UEFA) Best Goalkeeper : 2011
Euro Beach Soccer League Italian Event Best Goalkeeper: 2010
Mundialito Best Goalkeeper: 2011
Mundialito Best Goalkeeper: 2012

References

External links

Portuguese beach soccer players
Beach soccer goalkeepers
1978 births
Living people